The retroperitoneum or retroperitnium is an anatomical region that includes the peritoneum-covered organs and tissues that make up the posterior wall of the abdominal cavity and the pelvic space - which extends behind to the abdominal cavity. Definitions vary and can also can include the region of the wall of the pelvic basin.

The portion of the retroperitoneum that is posterior wall of the abdomen and superior to the iliac vessels is of importance in gynecological oncology. This is the region where para-aortic and paracaval lymphadenectomies are done. The lateral boundary of the retroperitoneum is defined by the ascending and descending colon. The retroperitoneum can be approached from above by moving the duodenum aside as far as the major renal blood vessels.

References

 
Morphology (biology)